The Provincial Court of Prince Edward Island is the provincial court of the Canadian province of Prince Edward Island, established according to the Provincial Court Act.

The Provincial Court has three judges, who sit in Summerside, Charlottetown, and Georgetown. The Court has jurisdiction to hear criminal offences and cases contrary to provincial legislation.

The Provincial Court judges also serve as judges of the Youth Court, which hears cases pursuant to the Youth Criminal Justice Act.

Applications for judicial reviews for decisions made in Provincial Court can be heard by the Supreme Court of Prince Edward Island, and appeals can be heard by the Court of Appeal of Prince Edward Island.

Current Judges

External links
 Official website

References

Prince Edward Island courts
Prince Edward Island